Sorana Gurian (born Sara Gurfinchel, October 18, 1913 – June 10, 1956) was a Romanian writer, journalist, and translator who wrote both in Romanian and in French.

Born in the Russian Empire, in Comrat, Bessarabia, she lost both of her parents while still young. After that, she and her two younger sisters, Lia and Isabela, were taken care of by their stepmother. She went to high school in Bender, passing her Baccalauréat exam in 1931, and then studied at the Letters Department of Chernivtsi University and Iași University without graduating.

She became a member of Eugen Lovinescu's Sburătorul literary circle in 1937, after returning from Berck, France, where she had gone for balneotherapeutical treatment of her extrapulmonary tuberculosis. While in France, it seems, she also studied at the Sorbonne. When she returned to Romania, she started publishing articles, first in the "Lumea" magazine in Iași, which were clearly democratic, antinationalist, antifascist and antirevisionist in style.

Feeling the effect of the antisemitic laws, she joined the underground opposition, which the Communists were also a part of. The Gestapo began to take an interest in her in 1942, and she hid for two years in a building basement, surviving with the help of the priest of the French legation and the head of a Catholic girls' boarding school in Bucharest. Under the influence of Vladimir Ghika, she had by then converted from Judaism to Catholicism.

After Romania changed sides on August 23, 1944, thanks to the fact that she knew Communists from her time in the underground opposition, she was named director of Universul. In the first three years after the war, she collaborated with many leftist publications, wrote propagandistic texts and, as she knew Russian, worked as an interpreter for the Allied Commission. But after a while, she was suspected by the Communist authorities of being a French spy, and realizing that the new regime imposed one restriction after another beginning a reign of terror, in 1949, she managed to escape from Romania by entering into a marriage of convenience with an Italian citizen helped by the Italian ambassador. After divorcing her husband, she went to Israel, where she stayed until 1950, and then emigrated to France, settling down in Paris.

She died of cancer in Paris in 1956.

Works
 Zilele nu se întorc niciodată, Bucharest, 1945
 Întâmplări dintre amurg şi noapte, Bucharest, 1946
 Les mailles du filet. Mon journal de Roumanie, Paris, 1950
 Les jours ne reviennent jamais, Paris, 1952
 Les amours impitoyables, Paris, 1953
 Recit d'un combat, Paris, 1956
 Ochiurile reţelei. Jurnalul meu din Romania, Bucharest, 2002

Translations
She translated works by Alexander Griboyedov, J. B. Priestley, Hans Prager, Franz Ludwig Neher, etc.

References

1913 births
1956 deaths
Romanian people of Moldovan descent
Deaths from cancer in France
Romanian writers
Romanian journalists
Romanian women journalists
Romanian translators
Jewish Romanian writers
People from Comrat
Romanian expatriates in France
20th-century French translators
Moldovan women writers
Romanian women writers
20th-century French women writers
20th-century journalists